National Register of Historic Places listings in Washington may refer to:

 National Register of Historic Places listings in Washington (state)
 National Register of Historic Places listings in Washington, D.C.